Filogaso is a comune (municipality) in the Province of Vibo Valentia in the Italian region Calabria, located about  southwest of Catanzaro and about  east of Vibo Valentia.

Filogaso borders the following municipalities: Capistrano, Maierato, San Nicola da Crissa, Sant'Onofrio, Vallelonga, Vazzano.

Demographic evolution

References

Cities and towns in Calabria